The Model 08 Semi-Automatic Pistol 0.3 Inch was a semi-automatic pistol used by the German Wehrmacht and the Luftwaffe during World War II. The Wehrmacht used it as an officers' pistol, while The Luftwaffe used it as a self-defense weapon for aircrew shot down over enemy territory.

References

Semi-automatic pistols of Germany